The City Mayor of Manila (sometimes referred to as, Alkalde ng Maynila) is the head of the executive branch of Manila's city government. The mayor holds office at Manila City Hall. Like all local government heads in the Philippines, the mayor is elected via popular vote, and may not be elected for a fourth consecutive term (although the former mayor may return to office after an interval of one term). In case of death, resignation or incapacity, the vice mayor becomes the mayor.

History
Prior to the arrival of Miguel López de Legazpi, Manila was a chiefdom headed by datus. From the defeat of Rajah Sulayman's forces in 1575 to the passage of the Maura Law in 1895, the chief executive of the city was appointed by the Spanish government to a person of Spanish descent. The highest position a Filipino was able to hold was the cabeza de barangay. With the passage of the Maura Law, the office of capitan municipal was established, with the people electing their own town heads, although the Spanish retained considerable influence and could veto decisions.

With the eruption of the Philippine Revolution and the Philippine–American War, the position reverted to an appointive head. With the advent of World War II, President Manuel L. Quezon appointed Jorge B. Vargas as mayor of the City of Greater Manila (forerunner of Metro Manila) in 1941. With the liberation of Manila in 1945 by combined Filipino and American soldiers under the United States Army and the Philippine Commonwealth Army including local recognized guerrillas against the Japanese Imperial forces, the earlier setup was used once again.

With the amendment of the city's charter in 1951, the position became an elective post. The first mayoral election was in 1951, and Manila's congressman from the 2nd district Arsenio Lacson defeated incumbent Manuel de la Fuente. A few years after the declaration of martial law by President Ferdinand Marcos, Manila and nearby cities like Quezon City, Caloocan, and Pasay, were overshadowed by the office of the governor of the newly created Metro Manila, whom Marcos appointed his wife, Imelda Marcos, to the position.

With Arsenio Lacson becoming the first elected mayor, the city of Manila underwent The Golden Age, was revitalized, and once again became the "Pearl of the Orient", a moniker it earned before the outbreak of the war. After Mayor Lacson's term in the 1950s, the city was led by Mayor Antonio Villegas during most of the 1960s, and Mayor Ramon Bagatsing for nearly the entire decade of the 1970s until the 1986 People Power Revolution that overthrew President Marcos.

Mayors Lacson, Villegas, and Bagatsing are often collectively considered as "the Big Three of Manila" for their rather long tenures as the city hall's chief executive (continuously for over three decades, from 1952–1986), but more importantly, for their indelible contribution to the development and progress of the city and their lasting legacy in uplifting the quality of life and welfare of the people of Manila.

With the ouster of Marcos following the People Power Revolution, President Corazon Aquino vacated all local executive officials and appointed officers in charge (OICs) in their place; she appointed party-mate Mel Lopez as OIC of Manila. Local elections were held in 1988, and Lopez was elected as mayor. The Local Government Code was enacted in 1991, and standardized the powers of Manila's mayor making it at par with other cities in the country.

The office of the mayor is often used as a springboard for further political ambitions. In 1961, Lacson bolted the Nacionalista Party to become the campaign manager of the Liberal Party's Diosdado Macapagal's presidential campaign. After Macapagal's victory, Lacson returned with the Nacionalistas and became a critic of the Macapagal administration. Lacson would've been likely the Nacionalista's candidate for the presidency in 1965, had not death intervened in 1962. In 1998, the sitting mayor of Manila, Alfredo Lim, did run as the Liberal Party's candidate for the presidency, but was beaten by Joseph Estrada, finishing fifth in a field of ten candidates, garnering 9% of the vote; Estrada later nominated him as Secretary of the Interior and Local Government. Lim later ran and won a Senate seat in 2001, but forfeited it three years when he ran and won as mayor again. Estrada, who was previously the mayor of bordering San Juan, defeated Lim as mayor of Manila in 2013. Their vice mayor, Isko Moreno, ran for the Senate and lost in 2016. Moreno defeated both Estrada and Lim in 2019. In 2021, Moreno announced his candidacy for president in the 2022 presidential election. Days later, Moreno's opponent Manny Pacquiao chose former mayor Lito Atienza as his running mate for vice president.

The longest-serving mayor of Manila is Ramon Bagatsing, who continuously served as the city's chief executive from 1971 until 1986. His tenure could have been longer if his term was not disrupted by the forced resignation of all local government unit heads and the appointment of officers in charge in their place after the 1986 revolution, to which Bagatsing fully supported and complied with, voluntarily handing over his position to OIC Mel Lopez.

List

Elections 

1951 Manila mayoral election
1955 Manila mayoral election
1959 Manila mayoral election
1963 Manila mayoral election
1967 Manila mayoral election
1971 Manila mayoral election
1980 Manila mayoral election
1988 Manila local elections
1992 Manila local elections
1995 Manila local elections
1998 Manila local elections
2001 Manila local elections
2004 Manila local elections
2007 Manila local elections
2010 Manila local elections
2013 Manila local elections
2016 Manila local elections
2019 Manila local elections
2022 Manila local elections
2025 Manila local elections

Vice mayor
The vice mayor is the second-highest official of the city. The vice mayor is elected via popular vote; although most mayoral candidates have running mates, the vice mayor is elected separately from the mayor. This can result in the mayor and the vice mayor coming from different political parties.

The vice mayor is the presiding officer of the Manila City Council, although they can only vote as the tiebreaker. When a mayor is removed from office, the vice mayor becomes the mayor until the scheduled next election.

See also
Gobernadorcillo
Cabeza de Barangay
Legislative districts of Manila. representation in the House of Representatives
Manila City Council

References

 
Mayors
Manila
Manila
Politics of Manila